Bluewater or Blue Water may refer to:
 Blue water, the global deep oceans
 Blue Water (missile), British short range nuclear missile of the 1960s
 Blue Water (train), an Amtrak line from eastern Michigan to Chicago
 Blue-water navy, a navy that can operate in deep waters of open oceans
 , a Panamanian tanker in service 1952-59

Boats
Blue Water 24, an American sailboat design

Places and structures
Australia
 Bluewater, Queensland, a suburb of Townsville
 Bluewater Beach, Queensland, a town within Bluewater

Canada
 Bluewater, Ontario, a town near Sarnia
 Bluewater Route (Ontario Highway 21), a tourist trail along the eastern shore of Lake Huron in Ontario
 Blue Water Bridge, linking Canada and the United States

South Africa
 Bluewater Bay, Eastern Cape, a seaside suburb of Port Elizabeth

United Kingdom
 Bluewater (shopping centre), a large shopping centre in Kent, England

United States
 Bluewater, Arizona, census-designated place
 Bluewater, California, census-designated place
 Bluewater, McKinley County, New Mexico, census-designated place
 Bluewater Acres, New Mexico, former name for Las Tusas census-designated place
 Bluewater Lake State Park, New Mexico
 Bluewater Village, New Mexico, census-designated place in Cibola County, location of Bluewater post office
 Bluewater Branch, a river in Tennessee
 Bluewater Creek, a stream in Missouri

Entertainment
Blue Water (film)
 Bluewater Productions, comic book publisher
 Blue Water Studios, an animation recording company

See also
 Blue Water High, Australian television drama series
 Nadia: The Secret of Blue Water, a Japanese animated series
 Nadia: The Secret of Blue Water (video game), based on the animated series
 Blue Waters (disambiguation)